

321001–321100 

|-id=024
| 321024 Gijon ||  || Gijon ( in Asturian) is the largest city and municipality in the autonomous community of Asturias in Spain || 
|-id=046
| 321046 Klushantsev ||  || Pavel Klushantsev (1910–1999), a Russian film director, producer, screenwriter of popular-science films || 
|}

321101–321200 

|-id=131
| 321131 Alishan ||  || The Alishan Range, located between Chiayi and Nantou, is a mountain area over 2,000 meters above sea level in central Taiwan. Alishan is well known for its sunrises, a sea of clouds, an afterglow, a forest, and railways. || 
|-id=197
| 321197 Qingdao ||  || The Chinese city of Qingdao (or Tsingtao), a mayor tourist and harbor city on the Shandong Peninsula in Eastern China, where a campus of the Shandong University of Science and Technology is also located. || 
|}

321201–321300 

|-bgcolor=#f2f2f2
| colspan=4 align=center | 
|}

321301–321400 

|-id=324
| 321324 Vytautas ||  || Vytautas Didysis the Great (1350–1430), one of the most famous rulers of medieval Lithuania. || 
|-id=357
| 321357 Mirzakhani || 2009 MM || Maryam Mirzakhani (1977–2017), a professor at Stanford, was an outstanding Iranian-born mathematician. || 
|}

321401–321500 

|-id=405
| 321405 Ingehorst ||  || Inge (born 1938) and Horst Zimmer (born 1931), parents of German co-discoverer Ute Zimmer || 
|-id=453
| 321453 Alexmarieann ||  || Aleksandr (born 1987), Mariia (born 1987) and Anna (born 1985), grandchildren of astronomer Klim Churyumov, co-discoverer of comet 67P (Rosetta mission). || 
|-id=484
| 321484 Marsaalam ||  || Marsa Alam, a town in south-eastern Egypt, located on the western shore of the Red Sea. || 
|-id=485
| 321485 Cross ||  || Henri-Edmond Cross (1856–1910), born Henri-Edmond-Joseph Delacroix, a French painter and printmaker. || 
|}

321501–321600 

|-id=577
| 321577 Keanureeves ||  || Keanu Reeves (born 1964) is a well-known Canadian actor. He is known for his iconic acting roles (including The Matrix, Constantine and Point Break) as well as for his kindness and selflessness. || 
|}

321601–321700 

|-bgcolor=#f2f2f2
| colspan=4 align=center | 
|}

321701–321800 

|-bgcolor=#f2f2f2
| colspan=4 align=center | 
|}

321801–321900 

|-bgcolor=#f2f2f2
| colspan=4 align=center | 
|}

321901–322000 

|-bgcolor=#f2f2f2
| colspan=4 align=center | 
|}

References 

321001-322000